Duane Ankney (born April 14, 1946) is a Republican member of the Montana Senate representing District 20. Ankney was a member of Montana House of Representatives for District 43, which represents a portion of the Yellowstone County area from 2007 to 2015.

Political positions

Energy
Ankney is a supporter of coal usage. In 2015, Ankney introduced Senate Bill 402, which would have required utilities to pay an impact fee to close a power plant before 2025. Portions of the revenue made from the fee would have gone to school districts and the Montana Department of Commerce. The bill failed on a 49-49 vote in the Montana House of Representatives. While debating with senators from Washington state on whether to shut down the Colstrip Power Plant, Ankney argued that the electricity helped build the state in the 1970s.

References

External links
 Duane Ankney at ballotpedia.org

Living people
1946 births
Republican Party members of the Montana House of Representatives
Republican Party Montana state senators
21st-century American politicians